Ilyasabad is a town in the southern suburbs of the city of Hyderabad, in Sindh, Pakistan.

See also 
 Latifabad
 Noorani Basti
 Hyderabad 

Neighbourhoods of Hyderabad, Sindh